"Slow Boat to China" is a song written by Mike Ragogna and recorded by American country music group Girls Next Door. It was released in May 1986 as the second single from their album The Girls Next Door. The song peaked at No. 8 on the Billboard Hot Country Singles chart.

Critical reception
An uncredited review in Cash Box magazine was favorable, saying that the group "entertains with their strong vocals and tight harmony. The easy-flowing melody should help the Girls’ new single sail into the Top 10, creating waves all along the way." A review from Billboard was also positive, calling the song "a brisk, pop-flavored effort."

Chart performance

References

1986 singles
Girls Next Door songs
MTM Records singles
Song recordings produced by Tommy West (producer)